Andasibe is a commune in Mananara Nord, Analanjirofo, Madagascar.

Andasibe may also refer to:
 Andasibe, Kandreho, a commune in Betsiboka, Madagascar
 Andasibe, Moramanga, a commune in Alaotra-Mangoro, Madagascar
 Andasibe-Mantadia National Park, a protected area near Andasibe, Moramanga
 Andasibe, Vavatenina, a commune in Analanjirofo, Madagascar